The Dudley Building Society is a UK building society, which has its head office in Brierley Hill, West Midlands. It is a member of the Building Societies Association.

References

External links
Dudley Building Society
Building Societies Association

Dudley
Building societies of England
Banks established in 1858
Organizations established in 1858
Organisations based in the West Midlands (county)
1858 establishments in England